Belarus competed at the 2012 Summer Olympics in London, United Kingdom, from 27 July to 12 August 2012. This was the nation's fifth appearance at the Summer Olympics in the post-Soviet era. The Belarus Olympic Committee sent a total of 166 athletes to the Games, 90 men and 76 women, to compete in 20 sports.

Belarus left London with a total of 10 medals (2 gold, 5 silver, and 3 bronze), their lowest in Summer Olympic history. Most of these medals were awarded to athletes in sprint canoeing. Sergei Martynov, who won gold for the first time, became the most successful Belarusian shooter in history, with a total of three Olympic medals. Three Belarusian athletes set the nation's historical record to win Olympic medals for the first time in their sporting events, including swimmer Aliaksandra Herasimenia, who took two silver in women's freestyle events. Tennis players and Grand Slam titleholders Max Mirnyi and Victoria Azarenka, who also won the bronze in women's singles, became Belarus's first ever Olympic champions in the mixed doubles event, after beating Great Britain's Andy Murray and Laura Robson. For the first time in its history, Belarus, however, did not win an Olympic medal in athletics and wrestling.

Originally, Belarus had won three gold medals in the nation's total medal count. On 13 August 2012, the International Olympic Committee stripped shot putter Nadzeya Astapchuk of her gold medal after testing positive for the anabolic steroid metenolone, and the gold medal was subsequently awarded to silver medalist Valerie Adams from New Zealand.

Medalists

Delegation 
Belarus Olympic Committee selected a team of 166 athletes, 90 men and 76 women, to compete in 20 sports, surpassing the record by just a single athlete short in Atlanta. Men's football was the only team-based sport in which Belarus had its representation in these Olympic games. There was only a single competitor in archery, and in badminton. Athletics was the largest team by sport, with a total of 49 competitors.

The Belarusian team featured five Olympic champions from Beijing (hammer throwers Aksana Miankova, sprint canoeing brothers Andrei and Aliaksandr Bahdanovich, and sprint kayakers Raman Piatrushenka, and Vadzim Makhneu). Shooters Sergei Martynov and Kanstantsin Lukashyk, and single sculls rower Ekaterina Karsten, competed at their sixth Olympic games, although they first appeared as part of either the Soviet Union (Martynov in 1988) or the Unified Team (Karsten and Lukashyk in 1992). Table tennis player Vladimir Samsonov became the fourth Belarusian athlete to compete at fifth Olympics. Meanwhile, trap shooter Andrei Kavalenka, at age 57, was the oldest athlete of the team, while rhythmic gymnast Nataliya Leshchyk was the youngest at age 17.

Professional tennis player Max Mirnyi, who won nine Grand Slam titles (including two from the U.S. Open) in his career, and competed at his fourth Olympics, became Belarus' flag bearer at the opening ceremony. Karsten, who won a total of five Olympic medals, served as the nation's team captain.

| width=78% align=left valign=top |
The following is the list of number of competitors participating in the Games. Note that reserves in fencing, field hockey, football, and handball are not counted as athletes:

Archery

Athletics

Belarus sent a total of 49 track and field athletes to the London games, after having achieved the required qualifying standards in their respective events (up to a maximum of three athletes in each event at the "A" standard, and one at the "B" standard). Hammer thrower and two-time Olympic medalist Ivan Tsikhan, was initially selected to the team, but IAAF decided to withdraw him from the competition, as a re-test of his sample from Athens was positive. On August 13, International Olympic Committee decided the shot putter Nadzeya Astapchuk, the nation's only track and field medalist, to strip off her gold medal at the London games after she was tested positive for the anabolic steroid metenolone.

Men
Track & road events

Field events

Combined events – Decathlon

Women
Track & road events

Field events

* Initially awarded gold in the shot put, Astapchuk was disqualified, and stripped of her medal, following positive drugs tests during the Games.

Combined events – Heptathlon

Badminton

Boxing

Men

Canoeing

Sprint
Belarus has so far qualified boats for the following events

Men

Women

Qualification Legend: FA = Qualify to final (medal); FB = Qualify to final B (non-medal)

Cycling

Road
Men

Track
Sprint

Pursuit

* Maryia Lohvinava was reserve for the women's team pursuit but did not compete.

Keirin

Omnium

Diving

Belarus has qualified in the following events.

Men

Equestrian

Eventing

Fencing

Belarus has qualified 3 fencers.

Men

Football

Belarus men's football team qualified for the event after win a play-off of the 2011 UEFA European Under-21 Football Championship.
 Men's team event – 1 team of 18 players

Men's tournament

Team roster

Group play

Gymnastics

Artistic
Men

Women

Rhythmic

Trampoline

Judo

Men

Modern pentathlon

Belarus has qualified four athletes in modern pentathlon.

Rowing

Belarus has qualified 2 boats.

Men

Women

Qualification Legend: FA=Final A (medal); FB=Final B (non-medal); FC=Final C (non-medal); FD=Final D (non-medal); FE=Final E (non-medal); FF=Final F (non-medal); SA/B=Semifinals A/B; SC/D=Semifinals C/D; SE/F=Semifinals E/F; QF=Quarterfinals; R=Repechage

Sailing

Belarus has so far qualified 1 boat for each of the following events

Men

Women

M = Medal race; EL = Eliminated – did not advance into the medal race

Shooting

Belarus has ensured seven quota places in the shooting events at the Games.

Men

Women

Swimming

Belarus sent a total of 8 swimmers at the London games, after having achieved qualifying standards in their respective events (up to a maximum of 2 swimmers in each event at the Olympic Qualifying Time (OQT), and 1 at the Olympic Selection Time (OST)): Belarus left London with a remarkable milestone in swimming, winning two silver medals by Aliaksandra Herasimenia in the women's 50 m freestyle and 100 m freestyle events, respectively.

Men

Women

Table tennis

Belarus has qualified two athletes for singles table tennis events. Based on their world rankings as of 16 May 2011 Vladimir Samsonov has qualified for the men's event and Viktoria Pavlovich for the women's.

Tennis

Belarus has qualified three athletes for tennis events. After losing to U.S. tennis star Serena Williams in the semi-finals, Victoria Azarenka managed to win the bronze medal in the women's singles against Russia's Maria Kirilenko. The following day, Azarenka and her partner Max Mirnyi defeated Great Britain's Andy Murray, men's singles champion, and his partner Laura Robson to win the gold medal during the final match in the first ever mixed doubles event. Azarenka and Mirnyi, not only claimed the title, but also set the nation's historical milestone to their sport.

Weightlifting

Belarus has qualified 4 men and 4 women.

Men

Women

Wrestling

Belarus has qualified eleven quotas.

Men's freestyle

Men's Greco-Roman

Women's freestyle

References

External links

Nations at the 2012 Summer Olympics
2012
2012 in Belarusian sport